Visa requirements for Surinamese citizens are administrative entry restrictions by the authorities of other states placed on citizens of the Suriname. As of 2 July 2019, Surinamese citizens had visa-free or visa on arrival access to 78 countries and territories, ranking the Surinamese passport 66th in terms of travel freedom according to the Henley Passport Index.

Visa requirements map

Visa requirements

Territories and disputed areas
Visa requirements for Surinamese citizens for visits to various territories, disputed areas and restricted zones:

Caribbean
 Visa policy toward Surinamese in the region
 British
 Dutch
 French

See also

Visa policy of Suriname
Surinamese passport

References and notes
References

Notes

Suriname
Foreign relations of Suriname